Jennifer Welter (born October 27, 1977) is an American football coach who is currently linebackers coach for the Vegas Vipers of the XFL. She was a defensive coaching intern for the National Football League's Arizona Cardinals during their training camp and the 2015 preseason, making her the first female coaching intern in the NFL. This is her third "first" for men's football in 2014 and 2015.

On February 12, 2015, Champions Indoor Football's Texas Revolution named Welter their linebackers and special teams coach making her the first woman to coach in a men's professional football league. This made her the second female player for a position other than kicker or placekick-holder on a men's professional football team, and the first at running back. She is not the first female to play a male dominant sport; however, she is the second woman after ice hockey player Hayley Wickenheiser to play a "contact" position in a male dominant sport and the first woman in football to do so.

Welter was featured in Mogul's #IAmAMogul campaign as part of Women's History Month in March 2016 for "changing the perception of what it means to be an NFL coach."

Prior competition
Welter is a veteran of several women's professional and semi-professional football teams (including the Dallas Diamonds and Dallas Dragons). She was a gold medal-winning member of Team USA at the IFAF Women's World Championship in 2010 and 2013. She played rugby in college.

Texas Revolution
Welter's first action as a Revolution running back came during a preseason game on February 15, 2014, against the North Texas Crunch. Welter rushed for three carries for −1 yards. On February 19, the Revolution named Welter to their 2014 regular season roster.

On February 12, 2015, the Revolution introduced Welter as their new linebackers and special teams coach. She is the first woman to coach in a men's professional football league.

Arizona Cardinals
On July 27, 2015, the Arizona Cardinals hired Welter as an assistant coaching intern for training camp and the preseason; as such, she is believed to be the first female coach in the NFL. Her internship with the Cardinals expired after the team's third preseason game on August 30, 2015. Her coaching style does not differ from many, according to Cardinals' Tyrann Mathieu. The Washington Post added, "The biggest question coming in was would guys in the NFL respond to a woman coaching them, and the obvious answer is yes".

Atlanta Legends
On December 11, 2018, Welter was hired by the Atlanta Legends of the newly-formed Alliance of American Football as a defensive specialist  under head coach Brad Childress.

Vegas Vipers 
Welter was officially hired by the Vegas Vipers on September 13, 2022

Education
Welter graduated from Boston College and has a master's degree in Sport psychology and a PhD in psychology from Capella University.

Awards 
In 2015, Jennifer Welter received the Women's Entrepreneurship Day Pioneer Award in recognition for her achievements in the sports world.

See also
 Kathryn Smith
 List of female American football players
 Justine Siegal

References

External links
 JenWelter.com

Living people
1977 births
American sportswomen
American football running backs
Female players of American football
Boston College alumni
Capella University alumni
Texas Revolution players
Arizona Cardinals coaches
Players of American football from Florida
People from Vero Beach, Florida
Female sports coaches
Texas Revolution coaches
Atlanta Legends coaches
21st-century American women
Female coaches of American football